is a Japanese manga artist.

Life 
Hanawa was born in Yorii, Saitama Prefecture. Since 1970 he worked as an illustrator. After reading the works of Yoshiharu Tsuge, he decided to switch to comic books. Hanawa's first work as a cartoonist was in 1971 with the short story "Kan no Mushi" about a boy whose mother sends him to a sadistic acupuncturist, in the alternative manga magazine Garo where he mainly worked in his career to follow. From 1992 to 1994 he drew the manga series Tensui for Afternoon magazine, which achieved a much higher circulation than Garo and similar underground publications. Through his work for Afternoon and other mainstream magazines such as Manga Action and Super Action, he became known to a wider audience. Since 1998, Hanawa has been working for AX, the successor of Garo.

In December 1994, he was arrested for illegally possessing modified model weapons and sentenced to three years in prison. Afterwards, he worked on the manga , recalling his detention, for which he was nominated for the 2001 Osamu Tezuka Cultural Prize and the 2006 Angoulême International Comics Festival Prize for Scenario. This autobiographical work became a bestseller and received a film adaptation in 2002 under the direction of Yoichi Sai. Masanao Amano describes how the "outstanding realism" of the work is almost overwhelming to the reader: "Due to the documentary-like style without any sense of desire and political message [the reader] is completely sucked into the work."

His 2014 horror short story collection Juso ("Curse") was a Jury selected work at the 2015 Japan Media Arts Festival.

Style and themes 
Hanawa is sometimes considered the successor to Yoshiharu Tsuge. At the beginning of his career, he dedicated himself to the ero-guro style and created erotic-grotesque works like Akai Yoru, about a samurai who rejects his thoughts of revenge and is driven to suicide by his wife, and Niku Yashiki. Many of these works were parodies of militarism and the traditional values of Japanese culture.  From the beginning of the 1980s, his manga were spiritually influenced by Buddhism and were located mainly in the Japan of the Edo and the Meiji periods and in a futuristic setting. The faces of his characters are reminiscent of Ukiyo-e; his drawings are detailed and dark.

Legacy 
Manga artist Gengoroh Tagame cites Hanawa's depictions of extreme violence as an influence for his work.

His work has been translated into English, Spanish, Portuguese, French and Italian.

Selected works 

 "Kan no Mushi" (かんのむし, one-shot in Garo, 1971)
 Gōho Dōji (護法童子, 1984-1986)
 Otogizōshi (御伽草子, 1991)
 Tensui (天水, serialized in Monthly Afternoon, 1992-1994)
 Doing Time (刑務所の中 Keimusho no Naka, serialized in AX, 1998-2000)
 Nippon Mukashibanashi (ニッポン昔話, 2000)
 Fujōbutsu Rei Dōjo (不成仏霊童女, serialized in Horror M, 2000–2007)
 Keimusho no Mae (刑務所の前, 2002-2007)
 Juso (呪詛, 2014)

References

External links
花輪和一先生の情報願いま～す！ - 非公式情報Twitterアカウント
花輪大明神 へそひかり - 非公式ファンサイト（現在は更新されていない）
花輪和一インタビュー - ガロ 1992年5月号
花輪和一「因果的表現の第一人者」 - 山田視覚芸術研究室

Living people
Manga artists from Saitama Prefecture
1947 births